Mahaan is a 1983 Hindi-language action drama film produced by Satyanarayana and Suryanarayana and directed by S. Ramanathan. The film stars Amitabh Bachchan in a triple role alongside Waheeda Rehman, Parveen Babi, Zeenat Aman, Ashok Kumar, Amjad Khan, Kader Khan, Aruna Irani, Sujit Kumar and Shakti Kapoor. The music is by R.D. Burman.The film is an official remake of the 1978 Kannada film Shankar Guru.

The film features popular songs like Jidhar Dekhoon Teri Tasveer Nazar Aati Hai, Pyaar Mein Dil Pe Maar De Goli and Ye Din To Aata Hai Ek Din Jawaani Mein. Amitabh Bachchan played a triple role in the film after playing double roles in several of his earlier films. This is also the only film of Amitabh Bachchan so far where he played a triple role.

Synopsis 
Vikram Singh (Amjad Khan) is framed for possession of drugs but claims he was framed by a business associate named Rajan (Sujit Kumar). After release from prison, he kills Rajan and frames his former lawyer Amit (Amitabh Bachchan). Amit is forced to go on the run, while his pregnant wife Janki (Waheeda Rehman) gives birth to twin sons Guru and Shankar (Both played by Amitabh Bachchan). Unfortunately, she becomes separated from one of her sons Guru when her son is stolen by a barren couple. With her husband on the run and one son missing, Janki is forced to raise Shankar on her own. Amit thinks his wife Janki is dead so he tries to lead a normal life using the name Rana Ranveer and is living with his adopted daughter Manju (Parveen Babi). But Janki is living in another city with Shankar who has become a police inspector. Guru had been brought up by a barren couple and grows up to be a theatre actor and pursued by Rita (Zeenat Aman). Manju meets and falls in love with Shankar, unaware that he is Rana Ranveer's long lost son. At the end, their lives intertwine and all are reunited and become a family again.

The movie celebrated golden jubilee (3 shows) in South India and in rest of the India it celebrated silver jubilee (3 shows).
When premiered in Sony TV in the year 2009, it earned highest TRP.

Cast 
 Amitabh Bachchan as Amit (Rana Ranveer) / Inspector Shankar /  Guru (Triple Role) (Father & Two Sons)
 Waheeda Rehman as Janki (Amit's Wife)
 Zeenat Aman as Rita (Guru's Love Interest)
 Parveen Babi as Manju (Shankar's Love Interest)
 Ashok Kumar as Rai Sahib (Rita's Grandfather)
 Amjad Khan as Vikram Singh
 Shakti Kapoor as Prem Singh (Vikram's Son)
 Kader Khan as Simon Sardar
 Aruna Irani as Tara
 Sujit Kumar as Rajan
 Mukri as Guru's Foster Father
 Urmila Bhatt as Guru's Foster Mother
 Pakhi as Advocate Gayatri
 Nandita Thakur as Doctor Nirmala
Babbanlal Yadav as Drama Director (Tara's husband)
 Harish Magon as Vikram's gang member

Soundtrack 
All lyrics by Anjaan.

References

External links 
 

1983 films
1980s action drama films
1980s Hindi-language films
Films scored by R. D. Burman
Films directed by S. Ramanathan
Hindi remakes of Kannada films
Twins in Indian films
Indian action drama films
Indian courtroom films
Fictional portrayals of the Maharashtra Police
1980s masala films
Films about drugs
Films set in Nepal
Films shot in Nepal
Films shot in Kathmandu